James Wan (born 26 February 1977) is an Australian director, producer, screenwriter and comic book writer. He has primarily worked in the horror genre as the co-creator of the Saw and Insidious franchises and the creator of The Conjuring Universe. The lattermost is the highest-grossing horror franchise, at over $2 billion. Wan is also the founder of  film and television production company Atomic Monster Productions.

Beginning his career with the Saw franchise, Wan made his feature directorial debut with its first film in 2004. The films became commercially successful and have grossed more than $1 billion globally. Following a period of setbacks, Wan returned with the Insidious series, where he directed the first film in 2010 and its 2013 sequel. The same year as the second Insidious, Wan directed the first Conjuring film to critical and commercial success. He served as the director of the second installment in 2016 while producing subsequent films in the franchise.

Outside of horror, Wan directed Furious 7 (2015), the seventh installment of the Fast & Furious franchise, and the DC Extended Universe superhero films Aquaman (2018) and Aquaman and the Lost Kingdom. Both grossed over $1 billion, making Wan the eighth director with two films to reach the milestone. He is the 19th highest-grossing director of all time as of 2021, with his films having grossed over  worldwide.

Early life and education
James Wan was born on 26 February 1977 in Kuching, Sarawak, Malaysia to Malaysian Chinese parents. Wan and his family moved to Perth, Western Australia when he was seven. He attended Lake Tuggeranong College in Canberra before returning to Perth as an adult. Wan relocated from Perth to Melbourne, where he attended RMIT University; he graduated from RMIT with a Bachelor of Arts in Media in 1998.

Career

2004–2006: Debut
Prior to 2003, Wan and his friend, fellow filmmaker Leigh Whannell, had begun writing a script for a horror film, citing their dreams and fears as inspiration for its plot. Upon completing the script, Wan and Whannell had wanted to select an excerpt from their script, later to be known as Saw and film it to pitch their film to studios. With the help of Charlie Clouser, who had composed the score for the film, and a few stand-in actors, Wan and Whannell shot the film with a relatively low budget. Whannell also decided to star in the film as Adam Stanheight, one of the film's main protagonists.

After the release of the full-length Saw, the film was met with overwhelming success in the box office both domestically and internationally. The film ended up grossing $55 million in America, and $48 million in other countries, totaling over US$103 million worldwide. This was over $100 million more than the production budget. This led the studio to green-light the sequel Saw II and later the rest of the Saw franchise. Since its inception, the Saw films have become the highest grossing horror franchise of all time worldwide in unadjusted dollars. In the United States alone, Saw is the second highest grossing horror franchise, behind only the Friday the 13th films by a margin of $10 million. Wan directed Saw (2004) and co-wrote Saw III (2006). Meanwhile, he and Whannell have predominately served as executive producers to the sequels Saw II, Saw III, Saw IV, Saw V, Saw VI, Saw 3D, Jigsaw, and Spiral.

2007–2009: Professional setbacks

In 2007, Wan directed two featured films. The first was the horror film Dead Silence, which was the result of advice from Wan and Whannell's agent at the time; Wan and Whannell have since stated that the film was a negative experience for them. Dead Silence featured Australian actor Ryan Kwanten and is based on the premise of a legend, whereby the ghost of a ventriloquist, Mary Shaw, removes the tongue of any person who screams in its presence. Rather than a gore movie, Wan described the film as "a creepy doll movie. It's in the spirit of those old Twilight Zone episodes or Hammer Horror Films. Very old-school." The film grossed over $22 million against a production budget of $20 million. It received negative reviews from critics.

Wan's second directorial film of 2007 was the vigilante action drama film Death Sentence (2007 film), a film adapted from the 1975 novel of the same name by Brian Garfield that was written as the sequel to Death Wish. The film's protagonist (Kevin Bacon) was a father seeking revenge for his murdered son, who was killed by a local gang. Whannell played a minor character as one of the gang members. Wan described the film as "a raw and gritty, 70s styled revenge thriller ... It's my arthouse movie with guns." The films grossed $17 million against a production budget of $20 million. Similar to Wan's previous film, it received negative reviews. Author Garfield later stated, "I think that, except for its ludicrous violence toward the end, the Death Sentence movie does depict its character's decline and the stupidity of vengeful vigilantism," adding, "As a story it made the point I wanted it to make."

Having worked on his previous three films continuously, Wan told the male lifestyle website CraveOnline that he was ready for "a bit of time off just to chill... but at the same time I'm using this opportunity to write again." In 2008, Wan directed a trailer for the survival horror video game Dead Space. During this time, Wan and Tobe Hooper were in talks to revive the Texas Chainsaw Massacre series with a trilogy of films, with both planning to direct although the studio instead made 2013's Texas Chainsaw 3D.

2010–2013: Career resurgence
Wan returned to the horror genre with the film Insidious, which premiered at the 2010 Toronto International Film Festival as part of the "Midnight Madness" program and was sold to Sony Pictures Worldwide for a seven-figure sum within four hours of the premiere's conclusion. The film began its American theatrical release in the first weekend of April 2011 and achieved third place at the box office, with an estimated US$13.5 million in ticket sales. Starring Patrick Wilson, Rose Byrne and Barbara Hershey, the film was made independently, as Wan sought complete creative control and also wanted to make a film that was markedly different from the gore that he had become synonymous with due to Saw. Wan stated in an interview, "the fact that Insidious was not being run by a committee really afforded me the luxury to make a film with lots of creepy, bizarre moments that a studio might not 'get.'" Wan later revealed that he wanted to "experiment in other genres, or make films in other genres because I love, Leigh and I have, we're not just horror fans. We're film fans. I love action films. I want to do action films. I want to do romantic comedies. I love all this stuff. So, if I find the good material, I'll do it.

Wan's next film, The Conjuring (2013), centered on the real life exploits of husband and wife Ed and Lorraine Warren, a married couple that investigated paranormal events. The film focused on the couple's most famous case second to the Amityville haunting, in which they investigated a witch's curse on a Rhode Island family farm. In his second collaboration with the pair, Patrick Wilson starred in the film, with him and Vera Farmiga playing the husband and wife respectively. Filming commenced in North Carolina, United States, in late February 2012 and New Line Cinema, together with Warner Bros. Pictures, had initially slated the film for a release on 25 January 2013. A test screening of the film occurred in October 2012 at the New York Comic Con event, where it screened in the IGN Theater, and the audience feedback was overwhelmingly positive. At that stage, Wan had several more weeks before the film was completed. The film was released in July 2013 and was a critical and commercial success, grossing $319.5 million.

After work on The Conjuring was complete, Wan directed a sequel to 2010's Insidious. The film was once again written by Wan's longtime collaborator and close friend, Whannell, and the cast of the original film returned. Filming for the sequel commenced in January 2013 and the film was released on 13 September 2013. The budget for the film had been described as "shoestring" by one media outlet. Oren Peli, the creator of the Paranormal Activity franchise, returned as an executive producer. Film District distributed Insidious: Chapter 2. It received mixed reviews but grossed over $161 million worldwide against a budget of $5 million. Wan later admitted that he wasn't as involved in the sequel, adding "it would be good to shepherd it and keep it more in track to the version I had when I made the first film so that it doesn't detour too far" since he never intended to make a sequel initially.

2014–present: Professional expansion, Atomic Monster and Blockbuster films

In early 2013, Wan entered into negotiations with Universal Pictures to direct the seventh installment to Fast & Furious action franchise after Justin Lin, who directed the previous four sequels, confirmed that he would not continue as director in January 2013. Wan was part of a directorial shortlist alongside Jeff Wadlow, Baltasar Kormákur and Harald Zwart. A final confirmation that Wan would direct was revealed in April 2013, with Lin approving. The film, Furious 7, was released in April 2015. It became the most commercially successful film in the franchise, grossing over $1.516 billion globally and received positive reviews.

Wan later completed a deal to direct The Conjuring 2 as part of a significant long-term deal with New Line Cinema. Head of New Line, Toby Emmerich, explained that Wan is the sole director that the studio signed a deal with, as New Line considers Wan to be "a class of one". The film was released on June 10, 2016, to high critical acclaim and commercial success. That same month, Wan launched his own production company, Atomic Monster Productions, at New Line Cinema. With the company, he develops and produces budget films in the science fiction, horror, and comedy genres. Films produced by the label included The Conjuring 2 and Lights Out.

Wan later produced Demonic, a Dimension Films horror movie that was scheduled for a December 2014 release, alongside Lee Clay. Wan conceived the idea for the film, which was directed by Will Canon and features Maria Bello in the lead role. Max La Bella penned the script. The film was eventually released on VOD in August 2017.

He then produced Annabelle, a spin-off of The Conjuring that served as a prequel to the 2013 film. The spin-off was profitable, made on a budget of $6.5 million and grossing over $256 million As part of the franchise, he also produced the prequel film Annabelle: Creation (2017); another Conjuring spin-off horror film,The Nun (2018); and Annabelle Comes Home (2019). Wan co-wrote The Nun and Annabelle Comes Home with Gary Dauberman.

In 2018, Wan directed the DC Extended Universe superhero film Aquaman. The film grossed over $1.148 billion worldwide, becoming the highest-grossing DCEU film as well as the highest-grossing film based on a DC Comics character, internationally, surpassing The Dark Knight Rises. In 2019, Wan developed a television series based on the character Swamp Thing, for the DC Universe streaming service.

On 7 August 2015, Wan signed-on to produce New Line Cinema's 2021 Mortal Kombat reboot. Four years later, the South Australian Government's budget included a huge boost to the South Australian Film Corporation, with the Mortal Kombat reboot, as the largest film production in the state's history, set to be a key recipient. In 2021, Wan directed the horror film Malignant, starring Annabelle Wallis; and co-produced the film adaptation of the slasher novel There's Someone Inside Your House by Stephanie Perkins, under his Atomic Monster label, alongside Shawn Levy's 21 Laps Entertainment for Netflix.

On November 16, 2022, it was announced that Wan's production company Atomic Monster was in talks to merge with Jason Blum's Blumhouse Productions with the company having a shared first look deal with Universal Pictures. Both companies would continue to operate as separate labels, with each maintaining its own creative autonomy and brand identity.

Future projects
In February 2018, Wan was confirmed to executive produce the animated adaptation of Stan Sakai's Usagi Yojimbo comic book series. The series will premiere on Netflix and will be a CGI animated show (titled Samurai Rabbit: The Usagi Chronicles). Later, The Hollywood Reporter reported that Wan and producers Roy Lee and Larry Sanitsky were developing a film adaptation of the Stephen King novel The Tommyknockers and shopping the package to studios. Deadline later reported that Universal had won the bidding war and acquired the feature film package. Wan will produce the film adaptation under his Atomic Monster label, with an eye to direct.

A sequel to Aquaman is also officially confirmed to be in development, with Warner Bros. Entertainment courting Wan to return as writer and director. Discussions of a follow-up film had begun during post-production, when Wan stated to the British movie magazine Total Film that the first film purposefully left room for further stories.

In 2021, Wan executive produced the television adaptation of I Know What You Did Last Summer for Amazon Prime. He is also attached to a television series based on the Italian horror comics series Dylan Dog. In March 2020, Wan was announced to be working with Universal Pictures to produce a modern remake of Frankenstein.

Wan will produce the horror film Border Patrol with Screen Gems, with Johannes Roberts directing the movie.

Unreleased projects
In 2009, a Whannel–Wan collaborative project, called X Ray, was announced and was described as a new "film noir/action project", with producer Robbie Brenner also attached to the project; however, as of December 2012, no further developments were reported. It was also announced that an adaptation of Scott O. Brown graphic novel Nightfall was to be Wan's next film after Death Sentence. The plot involves the events that take place after a criminal is sent to a Texas prison run by vampires. However, nothing materialised and Wan lost the rights to the film.

In 2012, Disney was reported to be developing a remake of The Rocketeer and Wan was in talks about directing the film. However, no film ever came to fruition. Similarly, Wan's negotiations to direct an adaption of the 1980s television series MacGyver film never materialised and he pulled out from directing due to scheduling conflicts. Instead, a reboot television series titled MacGyver premiered in September 2016. Wan executive produced the series and directed the pilot episode. Wan was also at one point attached to the director role for a live action Robotech film for Sony, but was replaced by Andy Muschietti in July 2017.

A "horror-tinged" spin-off of Aquaman called The Trench was in development. Wan would have produced while Noah Gardner and Aidan Fitzgerald were signed on to write the script. It was cancelled by April 2021.

Personal life
On 22 June 2019, Wan became engaged to Romanian-German actress Ingrid Bisu, making the announcement on his Instagram account. They married in November 2019.

Filmography

Film

Short film

Television

Recurring collaborations

Actors 
Throughout his directorial career, Wan has cast certain actors repeatedly:

Film crew 
Wan has also worked with certain crew members repeatedly throughout his directorial career:

Reception
Critical, public and commercial reception to films James Wan has directed as of 16 September 2021:

References

External links

 

1977 births
Living people
Film directors from Melbourne
Horror film directors
Australian comics writers
Malaysian emigrants to Australia
Malaysian people of Chinese descent
People who lost Malaysian citizenship
Australian expatriates in the United States
People from Kuching
People from Perth, Western Australia
RMIT University alumni
People educated at Lake Tuggeranong College
English-language film directors
Australian people of Malaysian descent
Australian people of Chinese descent
Malaysian comics writers
Malaysian expatriates in the United States